Damien Knabben (May 6, 1941 - April 2, 2006), born in Genk, was a Belgian futsal coach. He has managed Belgium national futsal team and Chinese Taipei national futsal team. He was also FIFA and UEFA futsal instructors.

See also
Damien Knabben Cup

References

External links
Damien Knabben at Futsal Planet

1941 births
2006 deaths
Sportspeople from Genk
Belgian sports coaches
Expatriate sportspeople in Taiwan
Futsal coaches